
Year 379 BC was a year of the pre-Julian Roman calendar. At the time, it was known as the Year of the Tribunate of Capitolinus, Vulso, Iullus, Sextilius, Albinius, Antistius, Trebonius and Erenucius (or, less frequently, year 375 Ab urbe condita). The denomination 379 BC for this year has been used since the early medieval period, when the Anno Domini calendar era became the prevalent method in Europe for naming years.

Events 
 By place 
 Greece 
 Sparta suppresses the Chalcidian League and imposes terms favourable to King Amyntas III of Macedonia.
 A small group of Theban exiles, led by Pelopidas, infiltrate the city of Thebes and assassinates the leaders of the pro-Spartan government. Epaminondas and Gorgidas lead a group of young men who break into the city's armories, take weapons, and surround the Spartans on the Cadmea, assisted by a force of Athenian hoplites. In the Theban assembly the next day, Epaminondas and Gorgidas bring Pelopidas and his men before the audience and exhort the Thebans to fight for their freedom. The assembly responds by acclaiming Pelopidas and his men as liberators. Fearing for their lives, the Spartan garrison surrenders and are evacuated. The Thebans of the pro-Spartan party are also allowed to surrender; they are subsequently executed.
 The Thebans are able to reconstitute their old Boeotian confederacy in a new, democratic form. The cities of Boeotia unite as a federation with an executive body composed of seven generals, or Boeotarchs, elected from seven districts throughout Boeotia.

Italy 

 Rome sends colonists to Setia, the inhabitants complain that their numbers are too small. Publius and Gaius Manlius are assigned to the Volsicans for campaign. A defeat follows for the Romans after having been attacked in their camp and foraging parties being killed. The Roman soldiers do not waver even when they have no leader. A dictator is soon afterwards requested but the Volsicans do not know how to follow up a victory. At the end of the year the Parenestines inspire the Latin peoples to revolt.

Births

Deaths

References